Naval Boat Building Yard (NBBY) is a shipyard of the Sri Lanka Navy situated in Welisara that produce small and specialist watercraft for the Sri Lanka Armed Forces, state institutions and civilians.

History 
The Boatyard was originally founded in 2000 as the Inshore Patrol Craft Construction Project (IPCCP) for the fabrication of small attack boats including swarm boats to combat the terrorist activities in North and East during the Sri Lankan Civil War.  Sea Tigers during its battles against the Sri Lankan Navy used swarming tactics with explosive suicide boats mixed in swarms of speed boats which was effective against larger vessels which were rammed by suicide boats while occupied by swarms. However with the Naval Boat Building Yard introducing the Arrow-class the asymmetric tactics of the Sea Tigers were no longer effective. In 2006, Navy confronted LTTE 21 times and in 2007 12 times and by 2008 (up-to-date) only 04 times as the Sea Tigers lost cadres and fighting platforms.

With the end of the war the NBBY has further expanded and have also exported boats to foreign militaries such as Nigeria and Seychelles. Further they have also begun production of civilian-use crafts for government projects and private use.

Products 
This list includes notable watercrafts built by the boat building yard.
Wave Rider-class patrol boat
 Cedric-class patrol boat
Landing Craft Utility (L 801)
Fast Landing Craft Utility (L 802)
Passenger Ferry
Fire Rescue boat Sri Lanka Coast Guard (CG 80)
 Kayaks
 Admiral Barge luxury passenger craft
 Fiberglass dinghy
 Lagoon craft passenger boat
 Dolphin craft -whale/dolphin watching boat
 Enterprise Class sailing boat
 Catamaran-type floating cafeteria
 Passenger crafts
Research Crafts
 Fireboats
 Ambulance craft
 Rigid Hull Inflatable Boat

References

External links
 Naval Boat Building Yard

Buildings and structures in Gampaha District
Shipyards of Asia
Sri Lanka Navy